Commercial space station may refer to:
Bigelow Commercial Space Station
Orbital Technologies Commercial Space Station

Could also refer to a small number of commercial trips to the International Space Station arranged through the Federal Space Agency of the Russian Federation.